Flather may refer to:

People
 Gary Flather (1937–2017), an English barrister and disability rights campaigner. 
 Mathew Flathers (c.1580–1607), English Roman Catholic priest. 
 Paul Flather (born 1954), a British academic.
 Shreela Flather, Baroness Flather (born 1934), a British-Indian politician.

Other
 Flather Hall, a dormitory for students at The Catholic University of America.